Žeretice is a municipality and village in Jičín District in the Hradec Králové Region of the Czech Republic. It has about 300 inhabitants.

Administrative parts
Villages of Hradíšťko and Vlhošť are administrative parts of Žeretice.

References

Villages in Jičín District